The islands comprising the Taiwan Area under the jurisdiction of the Republic of China (ROC) are classified into various island groups. The island of Taiwan, also known as Formosa, is the largest island and the main component of the ROC-controlled territories. Islands that are claimed by the ROC but not administered, including those under the control of the People's Republic of China, and those disputed with other countries such as Senkaku Islands and most of South China Sea Islands, are excluded from this list.

At the adoption of Additional Articles of the Constitution of the Republic of China in the 1990s, these islands collectively form the "Free area of the Republic of China" or known alternatively as "Taiwan Area", which legally defines the territorial extent under the actual control of the ROC government.

Some Taiwanese islands have various translations in English due to different systems of romanization in Chinese language in use, or derivation of differing linguistic origins from Mandarin, Hokkien, indigenous languages or other foreign languages. Some islands also have different names derived from particular historical periods which remain in use to this day.

Archipelagos of Taiwan 
There are in total of 168 islands, these islands can be classified into the following geographical units:

List of major islands by area
List of Taiwanese islands with over 5 km2 of area.

List of islands by geographical unit

Taiwan proper 

 Island of Taiwan (Formosa)
Kaohsiung
Cijin; formerly a longshore bar connected to the island of Taiwan at the southern tip, this link was severed in 1975 due to Kaohsiung Port construction.
Keelung City
Keelung Islet
Hoping Island
The Three Northern Islands
Huaping Islet
Mianhua Islet, the easternmost island under the actual control of the Republic of China
Pengjia Islet
Nantou County
Lalu; a lake island within the Sun Moon Lake
New Taipei
Twin Candlestick Islets (Zhútái Shuāng Yǔ)
Pingtung County
Hsiao Liuchiu (Lamay Islet)
Qixingyan (Seven star reefs;)
Taitung County
Green Island (Lyudao, Samasana)
Orchid Island (Lanyu, Ponso no Tao, Botel Tobago)
Lesser Orchid Island (Hsiao Lanyu, Jimagaod)
Sansiantai
Yilan County
Guishan Island / Gueishan Island (Turtle Mount)
 Guiluan Island (Kuei-luan Tao, Kiran-to;)

Penghu/Pescadores
Penghu Islands (Pescadores Islands) (Penghu County)
Penghu
Hujing Island (Hujing Islet, Huching Island)
Tongpan Island
Baisha
Baisha Main Island (白沙島)
Jibei Island
Chungtun (Zhongtun) Island (中屯嶼)
Yuanbei Island
Tiejhen (Tiezhen) Island (鐵砧嶼)
Gupo Island
Xianjiao Island
Bird Island (鳥嶼)
Mudou Island
Siyu (Yuwong, Yü-weng Tao, Gyoō-tō)
 Xiaomen Yu (Siaomen Islet, Hsiao-men hsü, Shō-mon-sho; 小門嶼)
 Haiqian Reef (海墘礁)
Cimei (Qimei;)
Wang-an
Hua Islet
Mau Islets (貓嶼)
Cau Islet (草嶼)
Nan Yun (南塭/南𥔋)
Maanshan Islet
Jiangjyunao Islet (Chiang-chün-ao hsü, Shōgunō-sho)
Chuanfanyu Reef
Toujin
Tiejhen
West Islet (Hsi-hsü-p'ing, Sei-sūpin)
East Islet (Tung-hsü-p'ing, Tō-sūpin)
Siji Islet (Hsi-chi hsü, Saikichi-sho)
Chutou Islet
Dongji Island (Dongji Islet, Tung-chi hsü, Tō-kichi-sho)

Kinmen/Quemoy 

Kinmen (Kinmen, Quemoy, Main island) (main island, divided into four townships)
Jinhu Township
Mu Yu 
etc.
Jinsha Township
Cao Islet 
Hou Islet/Xishanyu 
Baiyan Island
Dabo Reef
Xiaobo Reef (Siaobo Reef)
Dongge (Tung-ko) 
Guan'ao Jiao (Kuan-ao Chiao) 
Xiyuan Yu (Hsi-yüan Yü) 
Gou Yu (狗嶼)
Yangshanyu (洋山嶼)
etc.
Jinning Township
Daqian (大墘)
Jincheng Township
Jiangong Islet (建功嶼)
Hei Yan (Hei Yen) 
Dayan Islet, Dayan Yu (Ta-yen Hsü, Ta-lu-tung) 
etc.
Lieyu Township
Lesser Kinmen (Hsiao Kinmen, Lieyu) (second largest island  of Kinmen County)
Dadan Island 
Erdan Island (二膽島)
Fuxing Islet (Fuhsing Islet; Phaktia)
Menghu Islet
Shi Islet (Lion Islet)
Binlang Islet
Hsiao Kinmen Island (小金門島)
Houtouyu (後頭嶼)
Wu Jiao (Wu Chiao) 
Guizijiao (桂子礁)
Huangyu (黃嶼)
Sanjiaojiao/Yanyu (三腳礁/三角礁/煙嶼) 
Niuxinjiao (牛心礁)
Chijiaojiao (赤角礁)
Xiaodan (Hsiao-tan, Siaodan) 
Menkou Jiao (門口礁)
Tu Yu ('Rabbit Islet', Tuyu, T'u Hsü) 
Dananjiao (大南礁)
Shishan (石山)
Sandan/Sandandao (San-tan 三膽/三擔島) 
Sidan/Sidandao (Ssu-tan, Tao-sao Hsü 四膽/四擔島) 
Wudan (Wu-tan 五膽/五擔) 
Muyu (目嶼)
etc.

Matsu Islands 

Matsu Islands
Beigan (Peikan)
Gaodeng Island (Kaoteng; 高登島)
Daqiu Island
Xiaoqiu (Kiao Tse )
Wumingdao / Bluff Head (Wu-ming Tao) 
Qiaotou (Ch’iao-t’ou) 
Jinyu
Liang Island (亮島)
Langyan / Liang Reef (Liangjiao Reef)
Sanlianyu / Trio Rocks
Zhongdao
Baimiao
Laoshu
Turtle Island (亀島)

Nankan (Nangan)
Huangguanyu
Liuquanjiao 
Xiejiao
Beiquanjiao
Dongyin (Tungyin)
Xiyin (Hsiyin)
Beigu Reef  *The northernmost island under the actual control of the Republic of China. 
Zhongzhu Island (Chung-chu Tao)
Furong Reef (Furong Jiao) 
Shuangzijiao
Dongsha Dao (Tung-sha Tao)
Chukuang (Jyuguang)
Tungchu (Dongjyu, Dongquan; 東莒, 東犬)
Hsichu (Xijyu, Xiquan; 西莒, 西犬)
Xiniuyu (犀牛嶼)
Sheshan (蛇山)
Lintou'ao (林頭坳)
Dayu (大嶼)
Yongliou (永留嶼)

Wuqiu/Ockseu 

Wuqiu (Ockseu, Wuchiu, Wuciou)
Daqiu (Tachiu, Taciou)
Xiaoqiu (Hsiaochiu)

South China Sea Islands 

South China Sea Islands   (Administration under Cijin District, Kaohsiung Municipality; only the following islands listed below are controlled by the ROC)
Pratas Island (Tungsha, Dong-sha)
Spratly Islands (Nansha, Nan-sha; ; disputed with several Southeast Asian countries and China)
Taiping (Itu Aba)
Zhongzhou Reef (Chung-Chou Reef)

Disputed islands 
The highly controversial sovereignty disputes over both the Japan-controlled Senkaku Islands and the South China Sea Islands (which are disputed and controlled by several countries) are complex with the disputed status of both Taiwan (the territories outlined in the 1951 Treaty of San Francisco) and the Republic of China (ROC) which controls Taiwan. As the ROC and the People's Republic of China (PRC) still compete their de jure claim as the sole legitimate government of the entire China, they effectively lay claim to the same extent of islands, including the South China Sea Islands and the Senkaku Islands, among others. This makes these disputes multi-layered and therefore virtually impossible to solve by following the guidelines of international law.

The ROC maintains its historical claims to all of the South China Sea Islands. They are also claimed by five other claimants, namely the PRC, Vietnam, the Philippines, Malaysia, and Brunei. The islands within the Pratas and Spratly Islands which remain under the control of the ROC are assigned to Cijin District, Kaohsiung City, thus technically defining these islands to be part of the "Taiwan Area". The United Nations considers the South China Sea to be "international waters" and does not acknowledge any of the South China Sea Islands as "true islands". The acknowledgement of these islands as "true islands" is crucial because the definition of "islands" would justify the creation of an exclusive economic zone around them, which can be used to cut off international shipping lanes and to acquire natural resources such as oil which lie beneath the ocean.

Meanwhile, the Japanese-controlled Senkaku Islands are claimed by the ROC as "Diaoyutai Islands" within Toucheng Township, Yilan County and are considered to be part of geographic and provincial Taiwan by the ROC. The Senkaku Islands lie about 186 kilometres from the northeast of Taiwan Island, and situated roughly 330 kilometres from the east of mainland China. They form the westernmost extremity of the "Ryukyu Islands", which Japan administers as Okinawa Prefecture. The PRC also claims the Senkaku Islands as "Diaoyu Islands" as part of its claimed "Taiwan Province".

The PRC claims the islands of Taiwan and Penghu as part of its 23rd Taiwan Province, together with the Japanese-controlled Senkaku Islands (claimed as "Diaoyudao Islands"), which are also claimed by the ROC as part of its own Taiwan Province. The PRC claims Kinmen (Quemoy) as a county of the prefecture-level city Quanzhou, in Fujian Province. Matsu is claimed as part of Lianjiang County, part of Fuzhou, in Fujian Province. The Wuqiu islands are claimed as part of Xiuyu District, a district of the prefecture-level city Putian, in Fujian Province. Pratas Island is claimed as part of Chengqu in Shanwei (Swabue) Guangdong Province. The Nansha Islands controlled by the ROC, i.e. Taiping Island and Zhongzhou Reef, are claimed as part of Sansha, in Hainan Province. The PRC thus claims the ROC-controlled islands as part of its own Taiwan Province (Taiwan and Penghu), Fujian Province (Kinmen, Matsu and Wuqiu), Guangdong Province (Dongsha) and Hainan Province (Nansha).

See also 
Geography of Taiwan
List of islands
List of islands in the South China Sea
List of Taiwanese superlatives
Tachen Islands (islands evacuated in 1955)
Senkaku (Diaoyutai) Islands (disputed with Japan and the People's Republic of China)

References

Taiwan, List
Islands
Taiwan
Islands
Taiwan, List
Islands